Sabzazar (Punjabi) is a neighbourhood and union council (UC 112) located in Allama Iqbal Zone of Lahore, Punjab, Pakistan. Sabzazar is divided into two subdivisions, phase 1 & phase 2.

It is surrounded by areas like Allama Iqbal Town, Lalazaar Garden, and Awan Town.

This well-planned Lahore Development Authority housing scheme has good access to central Lahore and its outskirts. The Main Boulevard – Sabzazar is a busy road home to a wide range of shops and restaurants. A main boulevard and a service road intersect at the center of the society. A 200 bed "THQ Sabzazar Hospital" is situated at G-Block.

Sabzazar is full of lush green parks. For instance, Royal Park, Sabzazar Block-A park, G-Block Park, Al-Falah Park, Triangular Block-B Park, Ladies Park and more in the surrounding areas.

Transportation
Liaquat Chowk Bus Stop, situated in the heart of society, is where people can hop on buses moving towards the city. Multan Road has other options, almost all of which are a few minutes’ walk from Block H of Sabzazar Scheme. These stops include Bijli Ghar Bus Stop, Abubakar Stop, and Naqshbandi Stop.
The Orange Line (Lahore Metro) Metro Train, a first-of-its-kind metro project in the country, will pass through Sabzazar as well. One can get around in auto-rickshaws, private cabs, and minibuses too.
In addition to that, if you’re looking to travel by air, Allama Iqbal International Airport on Airport Road is nearly 15 kilometres away from the Sabzazar Scheme.

Markets
The residents have access to many shops within the Sabzazar scheme. Sabzazar Market and Model Bazar - Sabzazar are located near Liaqat Chowk in Block-G. These markets have everything from home essentials to fashion and other everyday items. Market K and Q-Block located on Street Number 1 is a small market with low-priced grocery. There is almost a Market in every block, the main service road has a range of meat shops, vegetable shops, and other grocery item stores. Residents have plenty of choices to choose from. The closest place to go for grocery shopping is A Block Store Market on Circular Road, Model Town which can be reached in 33 minutes’ drive. Here you will find a variety of fresh fruits and vegetables, dairy products, bread, and other food products. Besides that, G1 Market on Johar Town Block G which is around 24 kilometres away. It’s a vibrant shopping area with a number of stores of garments, household goods, automobile goods or any food – you will find it here. It’s like the main bazaar with a mixture of shops ranging from veggies to meat shopping to pharmacies. Besides that, there are plenty of book shops that offer a wide range of stationery items. Plus, the presence of some restaurants as well as juice corners, makes it easier for shoppers to enjoy food while shopping.
There are several shopping malls in and near Sabzazar Scheme. Iqbal Centre in Block-P, Makkah Plaza near Liaqat Chowk, Al-Kausar Departmental Store on Main Boulevard Sabzazar and Al-Nafay Centre in Block-G are some of the famous shopping plazas within the housing scheme. Residents can go towards the city to access a variety of different shopping malls. Such as Akbari Shopping Mall in New Muslim Town, Liberty Forum and Zarinas Shopping mall in Gulberg 3 area which is just 30 minutes’ drive away from the Sabzazar scheme.

Mosques
You will find numerous mosques in Sabzazar Scheme. Almost every block has a designated mosque. Some of the mosques located within the housing scheme are Jamia Masjid Faizan-e-Rasool on Block-D, Jamia Masjid Gulzar-e-Habib on Block-E, Jamia Masjid Al-Kareem in Block-K, Bilal Masjid near Makkah Chowk in Block-M. Madni Masjid and Zainab Masjid are in Block-H also Hazrat Bilal Masjid in Block-A.

Schools
You’ll find a myriad of schools & colleges in Sabzazar Scheme. In fact, residents of this society have easy access to some of the most prestigious schools & colleges. For instance, Government Girls High School, Government College of Commerce, Lahore Grammar School, American Lycetuff School, The Educators School, Allied School, The Smart School, International School of Cordoba, LDA Model High School, EFA School System, etc.. But the list doesn’t end here.

Banks
There are a number of major banks present in Sabzazar Scheme. For instance, Habib Bank Limited, Meezan Bank Limited, Allied Bank Limited, Sindh Bank, Faysal Bank, National Bank of Pakistan, MCB bank, Bank Alfalah, etc. Besides that, MCB Islamic Bank on Multan Road, and Eman Islamic bank on Olympia Street, Jahanzeb Block which can be reached in 6 minutes drive.

Food
Sabzazar Scheme is home to several restaurants and eateries serving delicious cuisines and snacks. For instance, Khawaja Jee BBQ, Nosh-e-Khas Restaurant, Salt n Spicy Fast food, Sabzazar Burgers and Burger Cottage are all located on Main Boulevard Sabzazar which runs through different blocks of the society. Besides that, Bahria DastarKhawan near Block-H is also a great place to enjoy a variety of Pakistani dishes. There are more diverse options near the National Highway N-5 like Hamza Tikka Shop, which serves delicious BBQ and Simki Sweets and Restaurants – which is famous for its sweet-offerings.

Other than the restaurants in Sabzazar Scheme, there is a great choice when it comes to bakeries and sweet shops like Gourmet Bakers & Sweets, Cakes & Bakes, Doce Bakers & Sweets, Qudrat e Shireen Sweets, and Bundu Khan Bakers, etc.

Sports & Personal Hygiene
There are several great workout spots in and near the Sabzazar Scheme. For starters, Zain Fitness Gym and Royal Fitness Gym are in Block G and Zaks gym in Block B Both facilities are well-reviewed and are available for men and women. Silver Gym is in Block-A and Punjab Gym is located on the society's Main Boulevard. For those into yoga, FAB Fitness in Block H of the housing society is just a few minutes’ walk away from Liaquat Chowk.

There are numerous well-reviewed salons and beauty parlors in and near the Sabzazar Scheme. Whether you’re looking for a fresh hair-cut or to get your hair colored, you can head over to one of the fine salons in the vicinity. For instance, Amir Salon in Block B Tresses Hair Salon and Mr. Chang Salon are in Block G, Al-Rahman Beauty Parlour, Sukhan Ladies Salon, and Mahtab Beauty Salon are located near Block P, Sana Beauty Salon is located on Clinton Street. Deena’s Beauty Salon on Main Road in Block-B, Innovate Salon in Block-A. For gents, there is Mr. Chang Salon in Block G, Hafiz Hair Salon, etc.

Sectarian issues
In April 2017, the neighborhood witnessed a sectarian killing, when Mr Ashfaq Ahmad, an Ahmadi Muslim doctor, was killed in a drive-by shooting, when on his way to offer Friday prayers with his grandson. When his car slowed down, a person approached him on his bike and shot him. In Pakistan, the Ahmadis have been defined as heretics and non-Muslim and are subjected to attacks and often systematic discrimination and persecution.

References

Allama Iqbal Zone
Populated places in Lahore District